No. 1 Senior High School in Baotou is a high school in Baotou, Inner Mongolia, China. Feng Yuxiang started it in 1925.

References

External links
 No. 1 Senior High School in Baotou 

Baotou
High schools in Inner Mongolia